Okazaki is a Japanese surname. Notable people with the surname include:

Chieko N. Okazaki (1926–2011), former counselor in the General Relief Society Presidency of the Church of Jesus Christ of Latter-day Saints
Dai Okazaki (AKA "Smelly", born 1971), Japanese comedic performer and former manga artist
, Japanese alpine skier
, Japanese shogi player
Isao Okazaki (1920–2006), Japanese right-wing activist
Katsuo Okazaki (1897–1965), served as the Japanese Foreign Minister between 1952 and 1954
Kenjiro Okazaki (born 1955), Japanese visual artist
Kyoko Okazaki (born 1963), a Japanese manga artist, winner of the Tezuka Osamu Cultural Prize in 2004
Makoto Okazaki (disambiguation), multiple people
Miles Okazaki (born 1974), American guitarist, arranger, and composer
Reiji Okazaki (1930–1975), Japanese scientist
Ritsuko Okazaki (1959–2004), Japanese singer-songwriter
, Japanese gymnast
Seishiro Okazaki (1890–1951), founder of the Danzan Ryu school of Jūjutsu
Shinji Okazaki (born 1986), Japanese footballer
Steven Okazaki (born 1952), Japanese-American filmmaker
Takashi Okazaki, Japanese manga artist known for Afro Samurai
, Japanese long jumper
Teruyuki Okazaki (born 1931), founder, chairman and chief instructor of the International Shotokan Karate Federation
Tomiko Okazaki (1944–2017), Japanese politician of the Democratic Party of Japan
Tomomi Okazaki (born 1971), Japanese speed skater
, Japanese scientist

Fictional characters
Jen Okazaki, character in the Australian mockumentary series Angry Boys
Tim Okazaki, Jen's son, also from Angry Boys
Okazaki, from the novel series Ring
Tomoya Okazaki, the main character from the visual novel and anime Clannad
Yumemi Okazaki, a character from the Touhou Project series

Japanese-language surnames